Jeanne Fusier-Gir (1885–1973) was a French stage and film actress. She was married to the painter Charles Gir, and was the mother of the film director François Gir.

Selected filmography

 The Crime of Sylvestre Bonnard (1929)
 The Man in Evening Clothes (1931)
 Luck (1931)
 The Devil's Holiday (1931)
 When Do You Commit Suicide? (1931)
 Beauty Spot (1932)
 Aces of the Turf (1932)
 The Champion Cook (1932)
 The Fish Woman (1932)
 The Midnight Prince (1934)
 Return to Paradise (1935)
 The Decoy (1935)
 Divine (1935)
 Marinella (1936)
 A Hen on a Wall (1936)
 Excursion Train (1936)
 The Citadel of Silence (1937)
 Claudine at School (1937)
 Life Dances On (1937)
 Miarka (1937)
 The Man of the Hour (1937)
 Gargousse (1938)
 Whirlwind of Paris (1939)
 Fire in the Straw (1939)
 The Blue Veil (1942)
 Le Corbeau (1942)
 The Guardian Angel (1942)
 Marie-Martine (1943)
 Paris Frills (1945)
 Pamela (1945)
 The Martyr of Bougival (1949)
 Two Loves (1949)
 Millionaires for One Day (1949)
 My Aunt from Honfleur (1949)
 Miquette (1950)
 The Treasure of Cantenac (1950)
 Blonde (1950)
 My Seal and Them (1951)
 My Friend Oscar (1951)
 Deburau (1951)
 Crazy for Love (1952)
 Women Are Angels (1952) 
 Monsieur Taxi (1952)
 The Cucuroux Family (1953)
 Wonderful Mentality (1953)
 When Do You Commit Suicide? (1953)
 Thirteen at the Table (1955)
 The Red Cloak (1955)
 Mannequins of Paris (1956)
 The Seventh Commandment (1957)
 The Crucible (1957)
 The Lord's Vineyard (1958)
 The Gardener of Argenteuil (1966)

References

Bibliography
 Philippe Rège. Encyclopedia of French Film Directors, Volume 1. Scarecrow Press, 2009.

External links

1885 births
1973 deaths
French television actresses
French film actresses
French stage actresses
Actresses from Paris